Alexander Armstrong (born 1970) is a British comedian and presenter.

Alexander Armstrong or Alex Armstrong may also refer to:

 Sir Alexander Armstrong (explorer) (1818–1899), British naval surgeon and explorer of the Arctic
 Alexander Armstrong (politician) (1916–1985), Australian politician
 Alexander Armstrong (rugby union) (born 1897), Australian rugby player
 Alexander Armstrong (Maryland politician) (1877–1939), Attorney General of Maryland
 Alex Louis Armstrong, fictional military officer in the Fullmetal Alchemist anime series

See also 
 Alexandra Armstrong
 Armstrong (surname)